The 1998–99 Midland Football Combination season was the 62nd in the history of Midland Football Combination, a football competition in England.

Premier Division

The Premier Division featured 16 clubs which competed in the division last season, along with two new clubs, promoted from Division One:
Alveston
Feckenham

League table

References

1998–99
9